The Clare Voyants are a former acoustic Irish folk rock group based in Phoenix, Arizona. The members before they disbanded in 2006 were Shay Veno (guitar/vocals), Jane Hilton (fiddle/vocals), Billy Brett (mandolin/vocals) and Pat Hershey (acoustic bass). Other previous members include Paul Knight (vocals/bodhran) and Brian Dwyer (bass).

The spelling of the name is a pun referring to the County Clare in Ireland.

Discography 
The Clare Voyants have released two albums. 

Their 1999 debut, "Pass it On", featured a number of traditional Irish tunes as well as the original songs "Pass it On", "The Dangerous Ones", "The Poet and the Soldier", "Danny Boy RIP" and "William Waits". All were written by frontman Shay Veno. Additionally, "Pass it On" includes a hidden track with the scathing hate ballad "I Hope You Die", also known as "Lets Be Friends" and "Sensitive Love Song". In 2005, "The Dangerous Ones" was included on the soundtrack to an independent film entitled "Little Victim" starring Robert Wagner.

The 2004 follow-up "County USA" also featured an assortment of traditional and original songs. Originals included the title track, "Song of the Bottle" and "The Night the Pub Burned Down", all by Shay Veno. Additionally there is an original song entitled "Guardian Angel" written by Billy Brett. Two instrumental originals were also included. "The Widdley Reel" by Jane Hilton and Shay Veno" and "Marcia's Waltzes" by Jane Hilton.

Live shows 
During their live shows, the devoted fans and friends of the band (known as "Voyantmaniacs") perform a number of "audience participation" rituals.

In addition to the traditionals and originals, the Voyants performed quite a few cover tunes. These included a number of songs by Shane MacGowan, Christy Moore, the Waterboys, Bob Dylan, U2, Woody Guthrie, Johnny Cash, Simon and Garfunkel, Finbar Furey and Bob Marley.

External links
AZ Irish Music Arizona Irish Music society website.
 Former Member Jane Hilton's Photo Page.

American folk rock groups